Angeline Morrison is a British multi-instrumentalist musician, songwriter and academic.

Life
Angeline Morrison was born in Birmingham to a Jamaican mother and a father from the Outer Hebrides. She attended her first folk club at the age of 17, and became active in the Midlands music scene. In 2002 she gained a PhD from the University of Plymouth with a thesis on blankness, silence and racial binarism. That year she moved to Truro, Cornwall. 

Morrison is half of the duos We Are Muffy (with Nick Duffy of The Lilac Time), and Rowan: Morrison (with The Rowan Amber Mill). She also sings with freakbeat bands The Mighty Sceptres (along with Nick Radford, who has also released music and collaborated with Morrison as Footful) and The Ambassadors of Sorrow.

Morrison's self-released album The Brown Girl and Other Folk Songs  was produced by Nick Duffy. Her album The Sorrow Songs (2022), produced by Eliza Carthy, tries to reinsert Black British history into the tradition of British folk music. The album's first song, 'Unknown African Boy (d.1830)' is told from the perspective of the mother of an eight-year-old West African boy, who was washed up on shore on the Isles of Scilly, when the slave ship Hope was wrecked there. Morrison performed the song on Later... with Jools Holland in 2022.

Discography

Solo albums
 Are You Ready Cat?. Freestyle records, 2013.
 The Brown Girl and Other Folk Songs. Self-released, 2022.
 The Sorrow Songs: Folk Songs of Black British Experience. Topic Records, 2022.

Collaborations
 The Ambassadors of Sorrow, Easterly. 2009.
 The Ambassadors of Sorrow, There Is No Ending. 2011. 
 Lack of Afro, This time. La Baleine Distribution, 2011.
 The Mighty Sceptres, All hail the Mighty Sceptres!. Ubiquity, 2015.
 We Are Muffy, The Charcoal Pool. Tapete Records, 2018.

References

External links 
 Angeline Morrison's official website

Year of birth missing (living people)
Alumni of the University of Plymouth
Academics of Falmouth University
British people of Jamaican descent
Cornish folk musicians
Cornish folk singers
Living people
Musicians from Birmingham, West Midlands